Gashimov is an Azerbaijani surname. Notable people with the surname include:

Vugar Gashimov (1986–2014), Azerbaijani chess player
Zaur Gashimov (born 1981), Azerbaijani footballer

See also
Gasimov

Azerbaijani-language surnames